Saas v/s Bahu is an Indian dance television series that aired on Sahara One channel in 2008.

Concept
Saas v/s Bahu is a dance competition between the Saases (mothers-in-law) and the Bahus (daughters-in-law) from some of the most popular Indian television series. The show was hosted by a television actor Karan Mehra. The 'saases' and 'bahus' will be scored a number out of 10 by the judges, Aruna Irani and Longinus Fernandes (Longie). Each week there was six contestants (three saases and three bahus) who will be competing with each other.

The top score the contestants can receive is 30 (20 from the judges and 10 from the audiences).

Performances
The first day the contestants are to do a solo performance, the second day they are assigned a partner to dance with, and the last day will be when the "bahus" will dance with their "saases" but get different scores and the teams will do their triplets. The team who wins the week will be in the quarter finals but they must be valued to be in it. On Mondays the contestants will do their solo performance. Tuesdays the contestants partner comes and does their solo performance. Wednesday the contestants and partner will do their doubles performance. Thursdays are when the saas and bahu dance together but they score separately and they will do their triplets. Fridays they will show the saas and bahu in the drawing room practicing for their big performance!

Quarter-finals
In the quarter finals the rules are little different. The contestants will dance to a song by an actor for solos. Then for the round which the contestant and partner dance together, they will dance on a certain genre, salsa or folk or rock and roll. The saas and bahu will do the same time. For the saas vs bahu round, one of them will dance an instrumental if the team thinks they are the best out of the three. The team who wins the week will be in the semifinals but they must be valued for it.

Semifinals
In the semifinals the rules are different from quarter-finals and on the regular basis. In the semifinal there are 12 contestants, six saases and six bahus. Only four can go in the Grand Finale from each team. Teammates vote their own teammates out after seeing their performance and scores. The semifinal spend two days for solo performances (about two, three or four a day). But here the rules are different. The contestants do not bring a partner: They just go and dance with their saas or bahus. But it is the impersonation round for them so one of them will dress up as a man and one of them as a woman. As always they will get the scores separately. On Friday, so they show the drawing room for all that has happened. Then the next week the saas and bahu will do their triplets (two a day so it ended on Tuesday). On Tuesday they did the vote out. For the next two days they showed who is in the Grand Finale and some of their performances and on Friday they show the drawing room for the triplets.

Contestants

Support
Some of the people from Indian television series came to support the teams:  Aman Verma, Chetan Hansraj, Hussain Kuwajerwala, Karan Wahi, Mazher Sayed, Naman Shaw, Salil Acharya, Sanjeet Bedi, Sharad Kelkar, Shaleen Bhanot and Sonia Chopra.

References
Tellychakkar News Article
Final Contestants
News Article on Rediff.com
News Article

Sahara One original programming
Indian reality television series
2008 Indian television series debuts
2008 Indian television series endings
Swastik Productions television series